There are several rivers named Manatee River

Belize 
 Manatee River (Belize)

United States 
 Manatee River (Florida)

See also 
 Manatee (disambiguation)